Nharea is a town and municipality in Bié Province in Angola. The municipality had a population of 126,339 in 2014.

History
Nharea has been promoted to the category of town on August 15, 1965.

External links
Facebook profile

References

Populated places in Bié Province
Municipalities of Angola